Shirozua jonasi, the orange hairstreak, is a butterfly of the subfamily Lycaeninae. It was described by Edward Wesley Janson in 1877. It is found in the Russian Far East (Amur, Ussuri), north-eastern China, Korea and Japan. It is widely distributed in the forest belt.

Above the butterfly is uniformly orange yellow, with only the extreme apex and the tail black. The white discal line is single, and proximally shaded with dark; the discocellular line is likewise dark and single.

Seitz "Z. jonasi Jans. Above uniformly orange-yellow, only the extreme apex and the tail black. Beneath similar to Japonica lutea (Hewitson, 1865), but the white discal line not double, but single, being proximally shaded with dark; the discocellular line likewise dark and single. — In the north of China and Japan; apparently not plentiful,flying about young trees in August."

Adults are on wing from mid-July to the end of August.

The larvae feed on Quercus variabilis, Quercus dentata, Quercus acutissima, Quercus serrata, Castanea crenata, Quercus mongolica, Lachrus tropicalis and Kermes miyasaleii. The larvae develop early in spring and are attended by ants of the genus Lasius (Lasius spathepus, Lasius fuliginosus and Lasius morisitai). The young larvae feed on young leaves and aphids. Older larvae prey on a variety of homopterans and drink their honeydew excretions. Pupation takes place in the soil near the base of the host tree.

Subspecies
Shirozua jonasi jonasi
Shirozua jonasi sichuanensis Sugiyama, 2004 (China: Sichuan)

References

 Shirozua jonasi at Insecta.pro

External links
images  representing  Shirozua  at  Consortium for the Barcode of Life

Butterflies described in 1887
Theclinae
Taxa named by Edward Wesley Janson
Butterflies of Asia